Jean Leonetti (born 9 July 1948) is a French politician and former president of The Republicans.  He represented Alpes-Maritimes's 7th constituency at the National Assembly from 1997 to 2011 and again from 2012 to 2017, as a member of the Radical Party, although he represented the UMP party as its Vice-President at the National Assembly.

References 

1948 births
Living people
Aix-Marseille University alumni
Physicians from Marseille
French people of Italian descent
The Republicans (France) politicians
Union for French Democracy politicians
Radical Party (France) politicians
Union for a Popular Movement politicians
Modern and Humanist France
Government ministers of France
20th-century French physicians
Deputies of the 12th National Assembly of the French Fifth Republic
Deputies of the 13th National Assembly of the French Fifth Republic
Deputies of the 14th National Assembly of the French Fifth Republic
Politicians from Provence-Alpes-Côte d'Azur
Mayors of places in Provence-Alpes-Côte d'Azur